The Ericsson Portable PC (EPPC) was created by Ericsson in 1985. It was a small computer with a weight of 8 kg. It had an Intel 8088 processor at 4.77 MHz and 256-512 kB of RAM. An optional builtin thermal printer and modem was available.

Appeared in the 23 (film).

References

External links
  Ericsson Portable PC
  Ericsson PC Page Rune's PC-Museum
  Bästa datorerna genom tiderna, plats 22 till 30
 

8086-based home computers
Ericsson